Lougheed Town Centre (sometimes abbreviated as Lougheed) is an elevated station on the Expo and Millennium Lines of Metro Vancouver's SkyTrain rapid transit system. The station is located at Lougheed Highway and Austin Road in Burnaby, British Columbia, Canada. Initially a Millennium Line station, a reorganization of SkyTrain service patterns in 2016 brought a branch of the Expo Line over the existing tracks to serve the station. It is one of three stations where transfer between the Expo Line and the Millennium Line is possible, the other two such points of transfer being Commercial–Broadway and Production Way–University stations.

The station is adjacent to a mid-size shopping mall, the City of Lougheed, formerly named "Lougheed Town Centre", from which the station drew its name. A Korean neighbourhood exists within walking distance of the south side of the station.

History
Lougheed Town Centre station was opened in 2002 as part of the original Millennium Line project. The station was designed by the architecture firm Paul Merrick Architects.

An unfinished third platform had been roughed in on the east side of the station during its construction, in anticipation of a future connection for a SkyTrain extension to Coquitlam. The provincial government suspended plans for the extension in the early 2000s, and in the interim TransLink decided to use light rail technology for the alignment instead of Bombardier's Advanced Rapid Transit technology (as used on SkyTrain's Expo and Millennium Lines), which would have rendered the roughed-in platform and the adjacent switches obsolete.

In 2008, the provincial government announced new plans for the line, including a return to the use of SkyTrain technology. As a result, the third platform at the station would be built and used to connect to the Evergreen Extension stations. In 2012, construction began on the Evergreen Extension, which included the third platform at Lougheed Town Centre station.

In 2016, SkyTrain service was reconfigured in anticipation of the opening of the Evergreen Extension; as a result, Lougheed Town Centre station became a temporary terminus station of the Millennium Line on October 22, 2016, with service running between VCC–Clark station and this station. At the same time, the third platform at the station opened, and a new Expo Line branch running between Waterfront and Production Way–University stations was created to serve the station. When the Evergreen Extension opened on December 2, 2016, Lafarge Lake–Douglas station became the eastern Millennium Line terminus.

For the first 18 months of service on the Evergreen Extension, the third platform served eastbound trains while the southern half of the island platform served westbound trains (with Millennium Line trains running left-handed through the station); this measure allowed a cross-platform transfer between Millennium Line trains headed to VCC–Clark station and Expo Line trains headed to Waterfront station (via Columbia station). On June 25, 2018, normal right-hand running of Millennium Line trains through the station resumed, making it possible to do a cross-platform transfer between Expo Line trains headed for Production Way–University station and Millennium Line trains headed to Lafarge Lake–Douglas station.

Services
The station is served by a bus loop and was the western terminus for the defunct 97 B-Line, which connected to Coquitlam Central station. Other bus connections to Burnaby, New Westminster, Port Moody, and Coquitlam areas make Lougheed Town Centre station a major transportation hub for the area and one of the busiest stations on the Millennium Line. On March 27, 2022, the Chilliwack Transit System moved the western terminus of BC Transit route 66 Fraser Valley Express to Lougheed Town Centre station, providing bus service to Abbotsford and Chilliwack.

Station information

Station layout

Entrances

 Austin Road entrance : located at the west end of the station platform, with an elevator linking the street, concourse, and platform levels; however, there is no escalator between street and concourse level.
 Gatineau Place entrance : located at the east end of the station, connecting the platform with the bus loop at street level via elevators and both up and down escalators. Retail shops are present at this entrance. Bus and HandyDart drop-off areas are also located on Gatineau Place, in front of the station plaza.
 Mall entrance : located on the concourse level of the Austin Road entrance. It connects to the City of Lougheed via a weather-protected walkway through the mall parking lot.

Transit connections

Lougheed Town Centre station provides an off-street transit exchange in between Gatineau Place and Lougheed Highway. The station is close to the boundary of Burnaby (fare zone 2) and Coquitlam (fare zone 3). , bus bay assignments were as follows:

References

External links

Expo Line (SkyTrain) stations
Millennium Line stations
Evergreen Extension stations
Railway stations in Canada opened in 2002
Buildings and structures in Burnaby
2002 establishments in British Columbia